Gerd Olbert (born 1 September 1948) is a German water polo player. He competed in the men's tournament at the 1972 Summer Olympics.

See also
 Germany men's Olympic water polo team records and statistics
 List of men's Olympic water polo tournament goalkeepers

References

External links
 

1948 births
Living people
Sportspeople from Mannheim
German male water polo players
Water polo goalkeepers
Olympic water polo players of West Germany
Water polo players at the 1972 Summer Olympics